Nadia Battocletti (born 12 April 2000) is an Italian female middle- and long-distance runner. She won the gold medal for the 5000 metres at the 2021 European Under-23 Championships. Battocletti earned four individual gold medals in the U20 and U23 age groups at the European Cross Country Championships. She is the Italian record holder for the indoor 3000 metres and 5 km road race.

As a 17-year-old, Battocletti won the bronze medal in the 3000 m at the 2017 European U20 Championships. At the 2019 edition of this championships, she earned silver for the 5000 m. She represented Italy at the 2020 Tokyo Olympics competing in the 5000 m. She won an Italian national title at senior level in 2018, becoming the first Italian millennial to do that. Battocletti is a five-time national champion.

Biography
As of 2022, Nadia Battocletti, who lives in Trentino region of northern Italy, was a student of architecture engineering. She is coached by her father Giuliano who was in the past an important Italian middle distance runner.

In August 2019 in Gothenburg, Sweden, she broke Italian under-20 record in the 3000 metres that had lasted for more than 30 years in a time of 9:04.46. In December that year, Battocletti was elected European Athlete of the Month by the European Athletic Association (EAA), the only Italian to succeed in this undertaking in 2019.

At the postponed 2020 Tokyo Olympics in 2021, the 21-year-old competed in the women's 5000 metres event, finishing seventh in the final in a personal best of 14:46.29.

2022–present
On 14 February 2022, Battocletti set her first senior Italian record at a meeting in Val-de-Reuil, France, breaking almost 15-year-old 3000 m indoor record of 8:44.81 established by Silvia Weissteiner; she clocked a 8:41.72 performance to finish second. On 23 April that year, she broke the national best in the two miles in Milan. Just seven days later, Battocletti set an Italian record in the 5 km road race at the adizero Road to Records event in Herzogenaurach, Germany, improving her personal best by 42 seconds for sixth place. She broke Maura Viceconte's record dating back to 2000 by 32 seconds.

The 22-year-old missed the World Championships held in Eugene, Oregon, U.S. in July with shin splints injury. In August, she was hit by glandular fever at the European Championships Munich 2022, where she finished seventh in the 5000 m.

At the pre-championships press conference of the European Cross Country Championships on home soil in Turin in December, Battocletti revealed that she had been on antibiotics until ten days back. Despite this, she won decisively on a hilly and demanding 5.722 km course her fourth consecutive European Cross Country gold medal, successfully defending her U23 title. She became only the second runner in history to claim back-to-back U23 titles.

Achievements

Personal bests
 1500 metres – 4:09.38 (Rovereto 2021)
 1500 metres indoor – 4:20.44 (Padua 2021)
 3000 metres – 8:50.66 (Doha 2022)
 3000 metres indoor – 8:41.72 (Val-de-Reuil 2022) 
 Two miles – 9:32.99 (Milan 2022) 
 5000 metres – 14:46.29 (Tokyo 2021)
Road
 5 kilometres – 15:13 (Herzogenaurach 2022)

Achievements

National titles
Battocletti won six national championships at individual senior level.

Italian Athletics Championships
1500 metres: 2021 (1)
5000 metres: 2018, 2020 (2)
Italian Cross Country Championships
Long course : 2021, 2022, 2023 (3)

See also
 European Athlete of the Month
 Italian all-time lists - 5000 metres

References

External links

2000 births
Living people
Italian female middle-distance runners
Italian female cross country runners
Athletics competitors of Fiamme Azzurre
Italian Athletics Championships winners
Athletes (track and field) at the 2020 Summer Olympics
Olympic athletes of Italy
21st-century Italian women